Acta Astronautica is a monthly peer-reviewed scientific journal covering all fields of physical, engineering, life, and social sciences related to the peaceful scientific exploration of space. The journal is widely known as one of the top aerospace engineering journals. The journal was established in 1955 under the name Astronautica Acta, obtaining its current title in 1974, with volume-numbering simultaneously restarting at 1. The journal is published by Elsevier, sponsored by the International Academy of Astronautics.

Abstracting and indexing
The journal is abstracted and indexed in:

According to the Journal Citation Reports, the journal has a 2020 impact factor of 2.413.

References

External links

Space science journals
Elsevier academic journals
Publications established in 1955
Monthly journals
English-language journals
1955 establishments in the Netherlands